Simone Bolelli was the defending champion, but he lost in the semifinals to Gilles Müller, 3–6, 7–5, 6–7(1–7).
Jerzy Janowicz won the title defeating Gilles Müller in the final 7–6(7–3), 6–3.

Seeds

Draw

Finals

Top half

Bottom half

References
 Main Draw
 Qualifying Draw

Roma Open - Singles
2012 Singles